Meera Dev Burman was an Indian film lyricist and musician. Meera, the wife of music director Sachin Dev Burman and mother of Rahul Dev Burman. She wrote lyrics for several Bengali films and helped her husband as an assistant in Hindi films.

Filmography

Popular songs
Lyricist
"Ke Jas Re Bhati Gang Baiya (বাংলা: কে যাস রে ভাটি গাঙ বাইয়া)" (remade in Hindi as "Sun Ri Pawan")
"Nitol Paye Rinik Jhinik (বাংলা: নিটোল পায়ে রিনিক ঝিনিক)" (remade in Hindi as "Jab Bhi Koi Kangna Bole"
"Shono Go Dokhino Hawa (বাংলা: শোন গো দখিনা হাওয়া প্রেম করেছি আমি)"
"Na Na Amare Shashi Cheyo Na (বাংলা: না না আমার এই শশী চেও না)"
"Ghate Lagaiya Dinga Pan Khaiya Jao (বাংলা: ঘাটে লাগাইয়া ডিঙা পান খাইয়া যাও বাসী আল্লাহর দোহাই)"
"Borne Gondhe Chhonde Geetite (বাংলা: বর্ণে গন্ধে ছন্দে গীতিতে হৃদয়ে দিয়েছো দোলা)" (remade in Hindi as "Phoolkn Ke Rang Se")
"Banshi Shune Ar Kaj Nai (বাংলা: বাঁশি শুনে আর কাজ নাই, সে যে ডাকাতিয়া বাঁশি)"
"Takdoom Takdoom Bajai Bangladesher Dhol (বাংলা: তাকদুম তাকদুম বাজাই বাংলাদেশের ঢোল)"
"Gaye Je Papiya (বাংলা: গায় যে পাপিয়া)"
"Jo Tum Todo Piya mai nahi todu re" (movie Silsila 1981 sung by Lata Mangeshkar)

Singer
"Dali Dali Phool Khile"
"Gaye Je Papiya"

References

S.D.Burman live archives

Indian lyricists
Indian musicians
People from Kolkata